Dar el Bacha is a palace located in the old medina of Marrakesh, Morocco.

History
Built in 1910, the Dar el Bacha, which means "house of the pasha", was the residence of Thami El Glaoui, who was given the title of pasha (roughly "governor" or other high official) of Marrakech by the Sultan Moulay Youssef in 1912. For years he was the most powerful political figure of the Moroccan south under French rule. He built his private palace on a lavish scale to impress guests. Some illustrious guests who visited Dar el Bacha include Colette, Maurice Ravel, Charlie Chaplin, Josephine Baker, Winston Churchill among others.

The palace was renovated by the Fondation nationale des musées (FNM) of Morocco and converted into a museum known as the Dar El Bacha – Musée des Confluences. It was inaugurated by Mohammed VI of Morocco on 9 July 2017.

Description 
Dar el Bacha represents a beautiful example of Moroccan architecture, with fountains and orange trees in the central courtyard, traditional seating areas, and a hammam. In addition to traditional Moroccan features, the palace also demonstrates influences of European architecture and was one of the earliest palaces in Marrakesh to feature ostentatious decoration on its exterior. Several of the original interior design features have been maintained and restored, including the carved and painted cedar wood doors, black and white checkered marble floors, ceilings covered in colorful zellij mosaics and columns painted with natural pigments such as indigo, saffron and poppy.

The museum also holds temporary exhibits highlighting the different facets of Moroccan culture, as well as various art objects from different cultures across the world. In 2018, one of its exhibits focused on displaying objects from places of worship in all three monotheistic religions (Judaism, Christianity, and Islam).

Coffee house
A revival of the palace's refined art de vivre, Bacha Coffee Room & Boutique is located in the museum courtyard.

See also 

 Dar Glaoui
 Telouet Kasbah

References

Museums in Morocco
Tourist attractions in Marrakesh
Buildings and structures completed in 1910
Palaces in Marrakesh
'Alawi architecture
20th-century architecture in Morocco